Jordan Brookes (born 18 April 1986) is an Edinburgh Comedy Award winning comedian.

Brookes was born in Merseyside and grew up in Surrey. His grandfather worked for the BBC and was the producer of 1980s soap opera Triangle. He went to the University of Wales, Newport to study animation and began stand-up comedy in Cardiff. He won the Welsh Unsigned Comedy Award in 2012.

He made his first appearance at the Edinburgh Festival Fringe in 2015. He was first nominated for the Edinburgh Comedy Award in 2017 for his show Body of Work. The following year he won the Comedians' Comedian award at the Chortle Awards. Then in 2019, he won the Main Prize at the Edinburgh Comedy Awards for his show I've Got Nothing which was described as 'stand-up's answer to Waiting For Godot'.

He has spoken of his admiration for stand-up Michael McIntyre, claiming he wanted to be "the existential Michael McIntyre, doing observational stuff but about disillusion, nihilism or sadness".

Edinburgh Festival Fringe shows

References

1986 births
Living people
English comedians